Serge Jean Julien Hubert (8 December 1915 – 26 May 1997) was a French sports shooter. He competed in the 50 metre pistol event at the 1960 Summer Olympics.

References

1915 births
1997 deaths
French male sport shooters
Olympic shooters of France
Shooters at the 1960 Summer Olympics
Sport shooters from Paris
20th-century French people